Erica Ollmann Saphire is an American structural biologist and immunologist and a professor at the La Jolla Institute for Immunology. Her research investigates the structural biology of viruses that cause hemorrhagic fever such as Ebola, Sudan, Marburg, Bundibugyo, and Lassa. She was awarded the Presidential Early Career Award for Scientists and Engineers in 2008.

Early life and education 
Saphire earned a Bachelor of Arts in biochemistry and cell biology from Rice University in 1993. She then moved to Scripps Research, where she earned a PhD in molecular biology in 2000. Her doctoral research focused on the crystal structure of a neutralizing antibody against HIV-1. She was an avid rugby player throughout college and graduate school, and toured twice with the United States women's national rugby union team.

Career and research 
After an immunology postdoctoral fellowship at Scripps Research, Saphire joined the faculty in the department of immunology as an assistant professor in 2003. She was promoted to associate professor in 2008 and full professor in 2012. In 2019, joined the faculty at the La Jolla Institute for Immunology.

Saphire is best known for her research on Ebola virus and other causes of viral hemorrhagic fever. She was the first to discover the structure of the Ebola virus surface glycoprotein and predicted that the Ebola virus receptor was located in the endosome rather than on the cell surface. Later, she showed that the Ebola virus VP40 matrix protein can fold into multiple distinct structures. Her laboratory has also discovered the structure of the glycoproteins of Sudan virus, Marburg virus, Bundibugyo virus, Lassa virus and LCMV. On field work in West Africa, she followed rodents to study how they spread viruses such as Ebola and Lassa. Saphire attracted national media attention in 2014 when she launched a crowdfunding appeal to raise funds for equipment to assist in research to fight Ebola virus. She directs the Viral Hemorrhagic Fever Immunotherapeutic Consortium (VIC).

In 2020, Saphire was named director of the Coronavirus Immunotherapy Consortium (CoVIC), an international effort to evaluate human antibodies against the novel coronavirus, SARS-CoV-2.  Her lab also co-led research into COVID-19 mutations with scientists at the Los Alamos National Laboratory.

Awards
Saphire received the Presidential Early Career Award for Scientists and Engineers and the Global Virus Network's Gallo Award for Scientific Excellence and Leadership. She received the American Society for Biochemistry and Molecular Biology's Young Investigator Award in 2015.

References

Year of birth missing (living people)
Living people
Structural biologists
American molecular biologists
American immunologists
American women biologists
Rice University alumni
Scripps Research faculty
Women immunologists
21st-century American biologists
21st-century American women scientists